Altered may refer to:
Altered (film), a 2006 film
Altered (drag racing), a former drag racing class
Altered scale

See also
 Alter (disambiguation)